Harry Kenneth Brown Jr. (January 27, 1938 – December 17, 2017) was an American football coach.  He was the 20th head football coach at The Apprentice School in Newport News, Virginia and he held that position for the 1964 season.  His coaching record at Apprentice was 0–8.

References

1938 births
2017 deaths
The Apprentice Builders football coaches